Sceloporus jarrovii, also known commonly as Yarrow's spiny lizard, is a species of lizard in the family Phrynosomatidae. The species is native to the southwestern United States and northern Mexico. There are two recognized subspecies.

Etymology
The specific name, jarrovii, is in honor of Henry Crécy Yarrow (November 19, 1840 – July 2, 1929), an American ornithologist, herpetologist, naturalist, and surgeon.

Geographic range

S. j. jarowii is found in the United States in the states of Arizona and New Mexico, and it is found in Mexico in the states of Chihuahua, Durango, Sonora, northern Tamaulipas, and western Zacatecas. The subspecies S. j. lineolateralis is found only in Mexico in the states of Durango and Zacatecas.

Habitat
The preferred natural habitats of S. jarrovii are forest and rocky areas.

Description
Its coloration includes tints of pink, green, blue, and copper. The top of the head is dark gray. Males have a blue throat and a blue belly. A complete black collar with a white inferior border distinguishes this lizard from similar species.

Reproduction
S. jarrovii is viviparous.

Subspecies
Two subspecies of S. jarrovii are recognized as being valid, including the nominotypical subspecies.
Sceloporus jarrovii jarrovii Cope, 1875 
Sceloporus jarrovii lineolateralis H.M. Smith, 1936 – lined spiny lizard

References

Further reading
Cope ED (1875). In: Yarrow HC (1875). Chapter IV. Report upon the Collections of Batrachians and Reptiles made in Portions of Nevada, Utah, California, Colorado, New Mexico, and Arizona, during the Years 1871, 1872, 1873, and 1874. Washington, District of Columbia: United States Government. pp. 509–584. (Sceloporus jarrovii, new species, pp. 569–571 + Plate XXIII, figures 2, 2b, 2c, 2d).
Smith HM (1936). "Descriptions of New Species of Lizards of the Genus Sceloporus from Mexico". Proceedings of the Biological Society of Washington 49: 87–96. (Sceloporus lineolateralis, new species, pp. 92–95).
Smith HM, Brodie ED Jr (1982). Reptiles of North America: A Guide to Field Identification. New York: Golden Press. 240 pp.  (paperback),  (hardcover). (Sceloporus jarrovii, pp. 118–119).
Stebbins RC (2003). A Field Guide to Western Reptiles and Amphibians, Third Edition. The Peterson Field Guide Series ®. Boston and New York: Houghton Mifflin Company. xiii + 533 pp., 56 color plates, 39 figures, 204 maps. (Sceloporus jarrovii, pp. 284–285 + Plate 30 + Map 95).

External links

Yarrow's Spiny Lizard  Sceloporus jarrovii. Reptiles and Amphibians of Arizona.

Sceloporus
Reptiles of Mexico
Reptiles of the United States
Reptiles described in 1875
Taxa named by Edward Drinker Cope
Fauna of the Sierra Madre Occidental